Extended physiological proprioception (EPP) is a concept pioneered by D.C. Simpson (1972) to describe the ability to perceive at the tip of a tool. Proprioception is the concept is that proprioceptors in the muscles and joints, couple with cutaneous receptors to identify and manage contacts between the body and the world. Extended physiological proprioception allows for this same process to apply to contacts between a tool that is being held and the world. The work was based on prostheses developed at the time in response to disabilities incurred by infants as the  result of use of the drug thalidomide by mothers from 1957 to 1962, with the tool in this case simply being the prosthesis itself.  How a person identifies with themself changes after a lower limb amputation affects body image, functioning, awareness, and future projections.

People with amputations have reported phantom limbs. This serves as evidence that the brain is hard-wired to perceive body image, making it notable that sensory input and proprioceptive feedback are not essential in its formation. Losing an anatomical part through amputation sets a person up for complex perceptual, emotional, and psychological responses. Such responses include phantom limb pain, which is the painful feeling some amputees incur after amputation in the area lost. Phantom limb pain permits a natural acceptance and use of prosthetic limbs.

See also
 The Extended Mind
 Embodied cognition
 Situated cognition

References

 DC Simpson and  others,  The choice of control system for the multimovement prosthesis: extended physiological proprioception (epp) The control of upper-extremity prostheses and orthoses    C. Thomas  (1974)	
 Dick H. Plettenburg,  ``Prosthetic control: a case for Extended Physiological Proprioception.   MEC '02 The Next Generation, Proceedings of the 2002 MyoElectric Controls/Powered Prosthetics Symposium  IBME, University of New Brunswick  (2002) http://hdl.handle.net/10161/2669
 Doubler JA, Childress, DS, An analysis of extended physiological proprioception as a prosthesis-control technique. (1984)
 Melita J. Giummarra, Stephen J. Gibson, Nellie Georgiou-Karistianis, and John L. Bradshaw, Central mechanisms in phantom limb perception: The past, present and future (2007)
Elfed Huw Price, A critical review of congenital phantom limb cases and a developmental theory for the basis of body image (2005)
Yue H. Yin, Yuan J. Fan, and Li D. Xu, Senior Member, EMG and EPP-Integrated Human–Machine Interface Between the Paralyzed and Rehabilitation Exoskeleton (2012)
Alex O. Holcombe, and Tatjana Seizova-Cajic, Illusory motion reversals from unambiguous motion with visual, proprioceptive, and tactile stimuli (2008)
Anne Hill, Phantom Limb Pain: A Review of the Literature on Attributes and Potential Mechanisms (1999)
CM Parkes, Psychosocial transitions: comparison between reactions to loss of a limb and loss of a spouse (1975)
Richard Batty, Laura McGrath, and Paula Reavey, Embodying limb absence in the negotiation of sexual intimacy (2014)
Huga Senra, Rui Aragao Oliveira, Isabel Leal and Cristina Vieira, Beyond the body image: a qualitative study on how adults experience lower limb amputation''  (2012)

Prosthetics